Alexander Bain (12 October 1810 – 2 January 1877) was a Scottish inventor and engineer who was first to invent and patent the electric clock. He invented the Telegraph Clock, which was a technology of synchronizing many electric clocks placed anywhere in the world; they would all have the exact same time. He also invented and patented the technology of the facsimile machine for scanning images and transmitting them across telegraph lines hundreds of miles away.

He installed the railway telegraph lines between Edinburgh and Glasgow, Scotland, for recording messages, to regulate the safe movement of trains, marking time, giving signals, and printing information at different locations. He invented a chemical telegraph technology of being able to transmit across a telegraph line messages at up to 1000 words per minute, while at the time Morse's telegraph could only produce 40 words a minute.

Early life

Bain was born in Houstry, near Watten, Caithness, Scotland. He was born on 12 October 1810. His father was a crofter. He had a twin sister, Margaret, and, in total, he had six sisters and six brothers. Bain was apprenticed to a clock maker in Wick, Scotland.

Bain learned the art of clock making and then first went to Edinburgh, Scotland. Later in 1837 went to London where he obtained work as a journeyman in Clerkenwell. He frequented the lectures at the Polytechnic Institution and Adelaide Gallery to further his knowledge of electricity. Later again he constructed his own workshop on Hanover Street in Edinburgh.

Career

Electric clocks and railway telegraphs
In 1840, desperate for money to develop his inventions, Bain mentioned his financial problems to the editor of the Mechanics Magazine, who introduced him to Sir Charles Wheatstone. Bain demonstrated his models to Wheatstone, who, when asked for his opinion, said he shouldn't bother developing those ideas any further as there was no future in them. Three months later Wheatstone demonstrated an electric clock to the Royal Society, claiming it was his own invention. However, Bain had already applied for a patent for it in October 1840 and received patent No. 8783 as the first electric clock invented and patented. Wheatstone tried to block Bain's patents, but failed. When Wheatstone organized an Act of Parliament to set up the Electric Telegraph Company, the House of Lords summoned Bain to give evidence, and eventually compelled the company to pay Bain £10,000 and give him a job as manager, causing Wheatstone to resign.

Bain's next invention was for Telegraphic Clocks. They were developed and constructed between 1837 and 1840. They were put into practical application in 1840 and a patent applied for. The patent received was dated 11 January 1841, and was in the names of John Barwise, chronometer maker, and Alexander Bain, mechanic. It describes his master electric clock which uses a pendulum kept moving by electromagnetic impulses that were also sent to other Telegraphic Clocks in a system of electric clocks located at various points around the world. The master clock could be located at the Smithsonian Institution in Washington D.C. or at the Royal Greenwich Observatory in London, England. The master clock with these impulses would cause all the clocks in the system to beat synchronously together as if one clock.

He caused the sun itself to set his Telegraphic Clocks to Greenwich Mean Time. In the meridian was placed a powerful glass lens and behind it a Thermo-Electric pile which made an electric battery. The lens was placed in such a manner that as soon as the sun came on the meridian of the place its rays were made to strike powerfully the end of the electric battery, which then generated an electric current pulse. That pulse was then sent out to all the clocks in the system and set them all instantaneously to the true Greenwich Mean Time.

In December 1841, Bain in conjunction with Lieutenant Thomas Wright RN, patented a method for helping to control railway trains with the use of electricity. The most significant idea incorporated in the patent was his plan for inverting the needle telegraph earlier developed by Ampere, Wheatstone and others: instead of making signals by a pivoted magnetic needle under the influence of an electromagnet, he made them by suspending a movable coil between the poles of a fixed magnet. A similar concept appears in Sir William Thomson's siphon recorder. Bain also proposed to make the coil record messages by printing them, an idea he developed further in a subsequent patent. Bain's telegraph was first used in December 1845 on the Edinburgh and Glasgow Railway which had opened in 1842. In January 1846 he convinced the directors of the Stockton and Darlington Railway to install his telegraph between the north and south ends of their Shildon tunnel. These instruments remained in use until September 1865.

On 12 December 1846, Bain, who was then living in Edinburgh, patented a chemical telegraph. He had seen that the Morse and other telegraphs then in use were comparatively slow, due to the mechanical inertia of their moving parts, and realized that the signal current could be used to make a readable mark on a moving paper tape soaked in a mixture of ammonium nitrate and potassium ferrocyanide, which gave a blue mark when a current was passed through it. The speed at which marks could be made on the paper was so high that hand signalling could not keep up with it, and so Bain devised a method of automatic signalling using punched paper tape. The concept was later used by Wheatstone in his automatic sender. Bain's chemical telegraph was tried between Paris and Lille, and attained a speed of 282 words in 52 seconds, a great advance on Morse's telegraph which could only give about 40 words per minute. Development on the concept later showed it was capable of operating at 1,000 words a minute.

In England Bain's telegraph was used on the wires of the Electric Telegraph Company. In 1850 it was used in America by Henry O'Reilly who obtained from Bain in 1849 the exclusive rights to use. However, it incurred the hostility of Samuel Morse, who obtained an injunction against it on the grounds that the paper tape and alphabet used fell under his 1840 patent. After this Bain's other chemical telegraph lines consolidated with Morse's companies.

A 1848 newspaper reported that electric clocks connected to telegraph lines for synchronizing together were included among the telegraphic inventions to which Bain had the rights to as the inventor. This was established under several patents which were dated years before the 1848 experiments made at the observatories of Philadelphia and Cincinnati. Bain's patents for synchronizing electric clocks together through telegraph lines (Telegraphic Clocks) were established years before Ezra Cornell devised the plan which he claims is the only one that works on Morse's telegraph system. The British Electric Telegraph Company had already purchased from Bain and was then in possession of several of his inventions. This had been seen and witnessed by many citizens, including most of the editors of the public journals of Great Britain at the time.

Surviving examples

One of Bain's telegraph instruments is on display at the National Museum of Scotland, probably from the Edinburgh and Glasgow Railway. The two instruments used by the Stockton and Darlington Railway at Shildon tunnel are in the National Railway Museum collection. The Shildon instruments were also provided with single-stroke bells, the hammers of which were held up by 'trip gear' which was released by the first electrical pulse to deflect the needle; upon completion of the message exchange the hammer then had to be raised again by hand. If the operator failed to hear the single ring, there was no method of repeating it – only the movement of the needle could be observed.

Facsimile machine

 Bain worked on an experimental fax machine from 1843. He used two pendulums for a message, one that scanned an image and another that wrote this scan. These pendulums' movements were synchronized line-by-line using a clock. He applied metal pins arranged on a cylinder made of insulating material for transmission. An electric probe then transmitted on-off pulses from the scan of the pins. These pulses were duplicated at the receiving station and reproduced the message on electrochemically sensitive paper that had been previously soaked in a specially formulated solution.

Bain's British patent 9745 description dated 27 May 1843 for improvements in electric printing claimed that a copy of any other surface can be taken. The transmitter and receiver were connected by five wires. In 1850 he applied for an improved version but was too late, as Frederick Bakewell had obtained a patent for his superior "image telegraph" that is sometimes known as a "copying telegraph" that was a major improvement over Bain's.

Bain's and Bakewell's laboratory mechanisms reproduced poor quality images and were not viable systems because the transmitter and receiver were never truly synchronized. In 1861, the first practical operating electro-mechanical commercially exploited telefax machine, the Pantelegraph, was invented by the Italian physicist Giovanni Caselli. He introduced the first commercial telefax service between Paris and Lyon at least 11 years before the invention of workable telephones.

Later life
Initially Bain made a considerable sum from his inventions but lost his wealth in poor investments.  In 1873, Sir William Thomson, Sir William Siemens, Latimer Clark and others obtained a Civil List pension for Bain from Prime Minister William Ewart Gladstone of £80 per year and the Royal Society gave him £150.

Death and legacy

Bain died on 2 January 1877, and was interred in the Auld Aisle Cemetery, Kirkintilloch. His tombstone was restored in 1959 because it was in a state of disrepair. The headstone had a fallacious date of death (1876) which was corrected to 1877.

JD Wetherspoon's pub in Wick, close to where Alexander Bain served his apprenticeship, is now named 'The Alexander Bain' after the inventor. Also, as a tribute to his inventions, the main British Telecom building in Glasgow is named Alexander Bain House.

One of the earliest examples of an electrically impulsed pendulum clock is on display at the Deutsches Uhrenmuseum. In 2016, he was posthumously awarded the Technology & Engineering Emmy Award for his pioneering work transmitting images electrically. A statuette award is on display in Kirkintilloch Town Hall.

Patents

References

Sources

Further reading

 Bain, Alexander, A History of Electric Clocks, London: Chapman and Hall, 1852
Gunn, Robert P., Alexander Bain of Watten. Genius of the North, Wick 1976
 Hackmann, W. D., Alexander Bain's Short History of the Electric Clock (1852), London: Turner & Devereux 1973.  
 Burns, R. W., Engineering Science and Education Journal, Vol 2, No2, April 1993. 
 Aked, C. K., Alexander Bain. The father of electric horology, Antiquarian Horology December, 1974. 
 Hope-Jones, F', Electrical Timekeeping. London: NAG Press, 1940.
 Kieve J, The Electric Telegraph. A Social and Economic History, Newton Abbot, Devon: David & Charles, 1973.
 Nicholas J. Wade, "The Bains of Psychology". Perception, 2001, volume 30, pages 777 - 783 DOI 10.1068/p3007ed

External links

 Significant Scots: Alexander Bain, electricscotland.com.
 Alexander Bain 1811-1877, visitdunkeld.com. 
 History of the Fax Machine, inventors.about.com.

Scottish inventors
1810 births
1877 deaths
Scottish clockmakers
Scottish electrical engineers
People from Caithness
Technicians
19th-century Scottish people
People from Kirkintilloch